Dunterton is a civil parish and small village in the Tavistock district in the county of Devon, England. The parish was mentioned in the Domesday Book, valued at 2 pounds and containing 18 households. In 1872 it had a population of 181.

References

Civil parishes in Devon

Villages in the Borough of West Devon